The 2019–20 Melbourne Stars season is the ninth in the club's history. Coached by David Hussey and captained by Glenn Maxwell, they competed in the BBL's 2019–20 season.

Season

Ladder

Regular season

Playoffs

Qualifier

The Challenger

The Final

Players

Squad
The following is the Stars men's squad for the 2019–20 Big Bash League season as of 27 January 2020.

 Player ruled out of season due to injury.

Personnel Changes

Incoming Players

Outgoing Players

Season statistics

Attendance

Home attendance

Batting

Most runs

Full Table on Cricinfo
 Last updated: 8 February 2020

Highest scores

Full Table on Cricinfo
 Last updated: 6 February 2020

Best strike rates

Full Table on Cricinfo
 Last updated: 8 February 2020

Most sixes

Full Table on Cricinfo
 Last updated: 8 February 2020

Bowling

Most wickets

Full Table on Cricinfo
 Last updated: 8 February 2020

Best bowling figures in an innings

Full Table on Cricinfo
 Last updated: 86 February 2020

Best economy rates

Full Table on Cricinfo
 Last updated: 8 February 2020

Hat-tricks

References

Melbourne Stars seasons